Chalcophana is a genus of leaf beetles in the subfamily Eumolpinae.

Species

 Chalcophana abdominalis Jacoby, 1897
 Chalcophana ancora Harold, 1874
 Chalcophana angulicollis Lefèvre, 1891
 Chalcophana apicalis Harold, 1874
 Chalcophana bogotana Harold, 1874
 Chalcophana brevicollis Jacoby, 1890
 Chalcophana bryanti Bechyné, 1955
 Chalcophana buckleyi Jacoby, 1880
 Chalcophana caligans Bechyné, 1951
 Chalcophana carinata Lefèvre, 1876
 Chalcophana championi Jacoby, 1882
 Chalcophana cincta Harold, 1874
 Chalcophana coerulipennis Jacoby, 1900
 Chalcophana colimana Bechyné, 1950
 Chalcophana consobrina Harold, 1874
 Chalcophana consobrina consobrina Harold, 1874
 Chalcophana consobrina reedi Bechyné, 1955
 Chalcophana conspicua Lefèvre, 1891
 Chalcophana continua Bechyné, 1949
 Chalcophana coronadoi Bechyné, 1947
 Chalcophana cuneata Bechyné, 1951
 Chalcophana cyanipennis Lefèvre, 1889
 Chalcophana densipennis Lefèvre, 1891
 Chalcophana depressa Jacoby, 1882
 Chalcophana dilecta Harold, 1874
 Chalcophana dimidiata (Baly, 1860)
 Chalcophana dimidiaticornis Jacoby, 1890
 Chalcophana discolor Harold, 1874
 Chalcophana dissimilis Jacoby, 1882
 Chalcophana divisa Jacoby, 1893
 Chalcophana divisa divisa Jacoby, 1893
 Chalcophana divisa stöckleini Bechyné, 1950
 Chalcophana dominula Bechyné, 1951
 Chalcophana dominula chanchamaya Bechyné, 1957
 Chalcophana dominula dominula Bechyné, 1951
 Chalcophana effulgens Erichson, 1847
 Chalcophana effulgens acutipennis Bechyné, 1951
 Chalcophana effulgens boreella Bechyné, 1953
 Chalcophana effulgens effulgens Erichson, 1847
 Chalcophana effulgens moyabamba Bechyné, 1955
 Chalcophana effulgens normandia Bechyné, 1955
 Chalcophana elongata Jacoby, 1897
 Chalcophana emarginata Jacoby, 1890
 Chalcophana erichsoni Jacoby, 1900
 Chalcophana excellens Bechyné, 1951
 Chalcophana euxina Bechyné, 1951
 Chalcophana fortepunctata Bechyné, 1951
 Chalcophana fossulata Bechyné, 1951
 Chalcophana freyi Bechyné, 1950
 Chalcophana fulvicollis (Jacoby, 1900)
 Chalcophana fulvocincta Jacoby, 1897
 Chalcophana fuscicornis Harold, 1874
 Chalcophana germari Jacoby, 1882
 Chalcophana gigantea Lefèvre, 1875
 Chalcophana gigas Jacoby, 1879
 Chalcophana glabrata (Fabricius, 1801)
 Chalcophana godmani Jacoby, 1882
 Chalcophana haroldi Lefèvre, 1878
 Chalcophana hilaris (Germar, 1824)
 Chalcophana histrio (Baly, 1864)
 Chalcophana hondurensis Bechyné, 1953
 Chalcophana humeralis Lefèvre, 1882
 Chalcophana hybrida Jacoby, 1882
 Chalcophana illustris Erichson, 1847
 Chalcophana impressicornis Jacoby, 1897
 Chalcophana inquilina Bechyné, 1953
 Chalcophana jacobyi Baly, 1881
 Chalcophana jacobyi binotata Baly, 1881
 Chalcophana jacobyi jacobyi Baly, 1881
 Chalcophana jacobyi parvinotata Bechyné, 1951
 Chalcophana kirschi Lefèvre, 1882
 Chalcophana kuscheli Bechyné, 1951
 Chalcophana landolti Lefèvre, 1878
 Chalcophana landolti landolti Lefèvre, 1878
 Chalcophana landolti venezuelensis Bechyné, 1997
 Chalcophana latifrons Bechyné, 1950
 Chalcophana longicornis Jacoby, 1897
 Chalcophana lutulenta Harold, 1874
 Chalcophana melas Bechyné, 1951
 Chalcophana metallica Bechyné, 1953
 Chalcophana mexicana Baly, 1881
 Chalcophana minarum Bechyné, 1950
 Chalcophana multipunctata Jacoby, 1893
 Chalcophana mutabilis Harold, 1874
 Chalcophana nigritarsis Jacoby, 1890
 Chalcophana noctivaga Bechyné, 1950
 Chalcophana nodulosa Bechyné, 1955
 Chalcophana oberthuri Jacoby, 1897
 Chalcophana obscura Jacoby, 1882
 Chalcophana obversa Bechyné, 1949
 Chalcophana oedificatoria Bechyné, 1950
 Chalcophana opulenta Baly, 1881
 Chalcophana oxapampa Bechyné, 1951
 Chalcophana palumbina Erichson, 1847
 Chalcophana paramba Bechyné, 1955
 Chalcophana parvicollis Harold, 1874
 Chalcophana peruana Harold, 1875
 Chalcophana porcaticolor Bechyné, 1950
 Chalcophana punctatissima Jacoby, 1897
 Chalcophana puncticollis Lefèvre, 1878
 Chalcophana punensis Bechyné, 1955
 Chalcophana quadricostata Jacoby, 1890
 Chalcophana romani Weise, 1921
 Chalcophana ruficrus (Germar, 1824)
 Chalcophana rufipennis Jacoby, 1878
 Chalcophana sabanilla Bechyné, 1955
 Chalcophana scapularis Lefèvre, 1884
 Chalcophana schneblei Scherer, 1964
 Chalcophana semicostulata Bechyné, 1951
 Chalcophana seminigra Harold, 1874
 Chalcophana semirufa Jacoby, 1878
 Chalcophana sericeipennis Bechyné, 1949
 Chalcophana sermonis Bechyné, 1951
 Chalcophana servula Lefèvre, 1878
 Chalcophana simplex Jacoby, 1882
 Chalcophana stenocara Bechyné, 1951
 Chalcophana stereomorpha Bechyné, 1951
 Chalcophana storkani Bechyné, 1947
 Chalcophana suavis Harold, 1874
 Chalcophana supervisoria Bechyné, 1950
 Chalcophana suturalis Jacoby, 1893
 Chalcophana terminalis Harold, 1874
 Chalcophana tippmanni Bechyné, 1951
 Chalcophana tosticornis Bechyné, 1953
 Chalcophana trinidadensis Bechyné, 1955
 Chalcophana versicolor Harold, 1874
 Chalcophana versicolor subrugosa Bechyné, 1947
 Chalcophana versicolor versicolor Harold, 1874
 Chalcophana verticalis Bechyné, 1953
 Chalcophana vilcanota Bechyné, 1955
 Chalcophana viridibasalis Jacoby, 1897
 Chalcophana viridipennis (Germar, 1824)
 Chalcophana visoria Bechyné, 1950
 Chalcophana volxemi Lefèvre, 1884
 Chalcophana wagneri Harold, 1874
 Chalcophana zischkai Bechyné, 1951

Synonyms:
 Chalcophana duodecipunctata Jacoby, 1897: moved to Guyanica
 Chalcophana fenestrata Jacoby, 1900: moved to Guyanica
 Chalcophana limbalis Harold, 1874: synonym of Chalcophana consobrina Harold, 1874
 Chalcophana picta Jacoby, 1900: moved to Guyanica
 Chalcophana ruficollis (Fabricius, 1801): synonym of Chalcophana glabrata (Fabricius, 1801)
 Chalcophana unifasciata Jacoby, 1879: synonym of Chalcophana illustris Erichson, 1847
 Chalcophana weyrauchi Bechyné, 1949: synonym of Chalcophana buckleyi Jacoby, 1880

References

Eumolpinae
Chrysomelidae genera
Beetles of North America
Beetles of Central America
Beetles of South America
Taxa named by Louis Alexandre Auguste Chevrolat